St George Hanover Square was a civil parish in the metropolitan area of London, England. The creation of the parish accompanied the building of the Church of St George's, Hanover Square, constructed by the Commission for Building Fifty New Churches to meet the demands of the growing population. The parish was formed in 1724 from part of the ancient parish of St Martin in the Fields in the Liberty of Westminster and county of Middlesex. It included some of the most fashionable areas of the West End of London, including Belgravia and Mayfair. Civil parish administration, known as a select vestry, was dominated by members of the British nobility until the parish adopted the Vestries Act 1831. The vestry was reformed again in 1855 by the Metropolis Management Act. In 1889 the parish became part of the County of London and the vestry was abolished in 1900, replaced by Westminster City Council. The parish continued to have nominal existence until 1922. As created, it was a parish for both church and civil purposes, but the boundaries of the ecclesiastical parish were adjusted in 1830, 1835 and 1865.

Creation
The New Churches in London and Westminster Act 1710 created the Commission for Building Fifty New Churches with the purpose of building new churches to deal with the increasing population. The commission also chose the boundaries of the new parishes and selected suitable persons to be parish officers and vestrymen. Within the parish were some of the most fashionable areas of the West End of London, with an aristocratic population. The select vestry created by the commission included 100 men. Much of the population of the parish was resident for only part of the year. The parish was created in 1724 from part of the ancient parish of St Martin in the Fields. It was within the Liberty of Westminster and the county of Middlesex. The parish vestry therefore had overlapping jurisdiction with the Westminster Court of Burgesses as well as the Westminster and Middlesex sessions.

Geography
The northern boundary was Bayswater Road and Oxford Street from Lancaster Gate, past Marble Arch, to Oxford Circus. The western boundary was the River Westbourne. The southern boundary was the River Thames. The parish included the part of Hyde Park northeast of the Serpentine and the Mayfair area. To the south it narrowed, including the Belgravia area, Knightsbridge, Victoria Station and Pimlico. Hanover Square was located near to the northeastern boundary. It included within its boundaries the grounds of Buckingham Palace, although the palace itself was in St Martin in the Fields.

Reform
The parish adopted the Vestries Act 1831, which provided for election of vestrymen by all ratepayers. The aristocratic dominance of the vestry declined. In 1815, 40% of vestrymen had titles and in 1845 it was half that.

In 1855, the parish vestry became a local authority within the area of responsibility of the Metropolitan Board of Works.

Under the Metropolis Management Act 1855 any parish that exceeded 2,000 ratepayers was to be divided into wards; however the parish  of St George Hanover Square had already been divided into seven wards by a local act in 1827 - "An Act for better paving, lighting, regulating and improving the parish of Saint George Hanover-square within the liberty of the city of Westminster" (7 Geo. 4). So the incorporated vestry inherited these wards and assigned vestrymen to them: Dover (6), Conduit (9), Grosvenor (12), Brook (15), Curzon (12), Knightsbridge (27) and The Out (27).

Ecclesiastical division
It was initially a parish for both ecclesiastical and civil purposes. However, by 1865 it was divided into eleven ecclesiastical districts.

Poor law
St George was a local act parish and so it did not become part of the New Poor Law system, following the Poor Law Amendment Act 1834. This meant it did not form part of a union and the parish vestry remained in control of poor law functions, instead of a separately elected board of guardians as was typical. Following the Metropolitan Poor Act 1867, it was joined with St Margaret and St John for this purpose in 1870 as the St George's Union and a board of guardians elected.

Abolition
In 1889 the parish became part of the County of London. The vestry was abolished in 1900 and replaced by Westminster City Council when it became part of the Metropolitan Borough of Westminster. It was abolished as a civil parish in 1922.

Population

Notable people
 Lady Amabel Kerr (1846-1906), writer

References

External links
 Church of St George, Hanover Square

History of the City of Westminster
History of local government in London (pre-1855)
Parishes governed by vestries (Metropolis)
Former civil parishes in London
1724 establishments in England
1922 disestablishments in England